Victoria-Hillside was a provincial electoral district for the Legislative Assembly of British Columbia, Canada from 1991 to 2009.

Demographics

Geography

History

Member of Legislative Assembly 

Its final MLA was Rob Fleming, a former Victoria City Councillor and former University of Victoria Students' Society chairperson. He was first elected as a city councillor in 1999. He represents the British Columbia New Democratic Party.

Election results 

|-
 
|NDP
|Robin Blencoe
|align="right"|11,117
|align="right"|51.39%
|align="right"|
|align="right"|$29,374

|}

External links 
BC Stats Profile - 2001 (pdf)
Results of 2001 election (pdf)
2001 Expenditures (pdf)
Results of 1996 election
1996 Expenditures (pdf)
Results of 1991 election
1991 Expenditures
Website of the Legislative Assembly of British Columbia

Former provincial electoral districts of British Columbia on Vancouver Island
Politics of Victoria, British Columbia